Shelthorpe (Shelly) is a large council estate south of the town centre of Loughborough in Leicestershire.

Split in half by Epinal Way, the majority of Shelthorpe estate lies along and off Shelthorpe Road, Park Road and Beaumont Road. The estate has its own chemist, doctors, post office, and a variety of other shops and businesses the estate also includes a 3 schools and over 5 nursery, pre-schools and daycare services.

The estate is a few hundred yards south of the town centre, and can be reached along Park Road, Leicester Road or the footpath through Loughborough Grammar School.

The area is served by three churches all located on Park Road - The Good Shepherd (Church of England), Beacon Christian Centre (Pentecostal) and Sacred Heart (Roman Catholic).

Shelthorpe has its own community association, which along with the local authorities helps to improve and enhance the facilities and living standard of the residents of Shelthorpe.

Housing estates in England
Loughborough